Bowls have been part of the Island Games events on three occasions since their introduction in 1987. If the host nation chooses to include bowls as an event, they have the option of one of indoor bowls, outdoor bowls or ten pin bowling.

Indoor bowls were part of the 1987 and 2005 Games, whilst ten-pin bowling was part of the 1999 Games and is on the list of prospective events for the 2019 Games. To date, no outdoor bowls competition has been held at an Island Games.

Medals are awarded in both individual and team competitions, with varying number of medal events between the games. Each island to submit one competitor/team for each medal event.

Events

Indoor bowls

Top medalists

Men's results

Women's results

Ten pin bowling

Top medalists

Men's results

Women's results

|}

References

 
Sports at the Island Games
Island Games